Rebecca Jane Middleton (June 27, 1979 – July 3, 1996) was a Canadian teenager who was raped and murdered while on vacation in Bermuda. She was stabbed 35 times, although alive when found, she bled to death before paramedics arrived.

Due to numerous errors in the prosecution of the perpetrators and double jeopardy, no one was charged with the murder.  Due to the heinous nature of the crime, the lack of prosecution and the persistence of the Middleton family in seeking justice, it became a high-profile case and attracted the attention of Cherie Booth (the former UK Prime Minister's wife).

References

Murder in Bermuda
1996 in Bermuda
Incidents of violence against girls